Ch. Rock Ridge Night Rocket was a Bedlington Terrier that won best in show at the Westminster Kennel Club Dog Show in 1948. A LIFE magazine article called him the "Best U.S. Dog". He was owned by William Rockefeller's family.

References 

Best in Show winners of the Westminster Kennel Club Dog Show